The Cambridge Edition of the Letters of Ernest Hemingway is an ongoing scholarly multi-volume publication of the letters of Ernest Hemingway undertaken by the Cambridge University Press. Out of the projected 16 volumes, the first volume, covering years from 1907 to 1922, was published in 2011. The project, when completed, will collect every extant Hemingway letter, numbering over 6,000, and is being edited by Sandra Spanier, professor of English at Pennsylvania State University. The project may take 20 years to finish.

Volume 1
 Available in Hardback and Fine/Leather Binding
 Years covered: 1907–1922
 Published: 20 September 2011
 Pages: 516

Volume 2
 Available in Hardback and Fine/Leather Binding (£75)
 Years covered: 1923–1925
 Published: 30 September 2013
 Pages: 515
 
 Fine/Leather Binding:

Volume 3
 Available in Hardback
 Years covered: 1926–1929
 Published: 14 October 2015
 Pages: 731

Volume 4
 Available in Hardback
 Years covered: 1929–1931
 Published: 16 November 2017
 Pages: 818

Volume 5
 Available in Hardback
 Years covered: 1932–1934
 Published: 31 July 2020
 Pages: 840

References

Works by Ernest Hemingway
Series of books
Correspondences
Collections of letters